A layer is the deposition of molecules on a substrate or base (glass, ceramic,  semiconductor, or plastic/bioplastic).

High temperature substrates includes stainless steel and polyimide film (expensive)   and PET (cheap).

A depth of less than one micrometre is generally called a thin film while a depth greater than one micrometre is called a coating.

A web is a flexible substrate.

See also 

Coating
Heterojunction
Nanoparticle
Organic electronics
Passivation
Printed electronics
Sputtering
Thermal annealing
Transparent conducting oxide

References 

Electronics concepts
Semiconductor device fabrication